Michael Blaudzun  (born 30 April 1973 in Herning) is a Danish former professional road bicycle racer. Michael is the son of 1972 Summer Olympics track cycling bronze medalist Verner Blaudzun and a strong individual time trial rider who has won the Danish national championship in that discipline in 2001, 2003 and 2005.

After Michael Blaudzun won the 1994 Danish Road Racing Championship while riding for amateur team Herning CK, he was signed for the remainder of the 1994 season as a stagiaire at professional team Word Perfect. For the 1995 season, the Word Perfect team changed its name to Novell, and Michael Blaudzun turned professional for the outfit, riding for the team until 1997, by which time the team had once again changed its name to Rabobank. Blaudzun had a few wins in his time at Rabobank, but when he switched to German outfit Team Telekom in 1998, he only managed a handful of secondary finishes.

For the 1999 season, he switched to Danish Team home - Jack & Jones (later named Team CSC) based on his former team Herning CK. Blaudzun participated in the first ever Tour de France for Team CSC, in the 2000 edition, but he quit the race at the 12h stage. He would ride a further two editions of the Tour de France in 2001 and 2003.

Major results

1994
  National Road Racing Champion
1996
 PostGirot Open
 Stage 5B, Rheinland-Pfalz Rundfahrt
1999
 Stage 13 and Overall, Herald Sun Tour
 Prologue, Region Stuttgart Etappenrennen
2001
  National Time Trial Champion
 Hessen Rundfahrt
 84th Overall, 2001 Tour de France
2003
  National Time Trial Champion
 45th Overall, 2003 Tour de France
2004
  National Road Racing Champion
2005
 GP Herning
  National Time Trial Champion
 2nd overall, 2005 Tour of Britain

References
Lars Werge, "Drømmeholdet - historien om CSC" (The dream team - the history of CSC), Denmark, 2005,

External links
 Profile at Team CSC

Danish male cyclists
1973 births
Living people
People from Herning Municipality
Sportspeople from the Central Denmark Region